Gamil Atia Ibrahim جميل عطية إبراهيم (1937 in Egypt, specifically Giza – April 10, 2020, in Basel, Switzerland). He is an Egyptian novelist and writer. In addition, he is one of the founders of the literary magazine (Gallery 68) as he was one of the pioneers of the sixth literary movement. The most prominent work is (Joining the Sea) and his trilogy (1952) which was ranked by the Arab Writers Union among the best hundred Arab novels, (1954 papers) and (1981).

Bibliography 
Gamil was born in Giza Governorate year 1937. He obtained various academic certificates that led him to work in several jobs. However, before graduating from his university, he worked as an account clerk specifically in textile factory (Shubra Al Khaymah). Next, he worked as a music teacher for children as well as a teacher of arithmetic, algebra and engineering for junior high school in Egypt. Soon, he joined Al Imam Al Asili School in Morocco (Asilah). Through this experience, he wrote his novel (Asilah). After graduating from university, he published some stories and worked as a both financial and administrative inspector in Ministry of Youth back in the sixties. After that, he remained in mass culture until he traveled to Switzerland year 1979, after moving to mass culture because of the following professors: Naguib Maffouz, Saad Eddin, Wahba and Yaqoub Al Shaouni. As a reporter for number of Arab newspapers, he worked and translated for the United Nations.

Works 

 Joining the Sea
 The Sea is not Full
 Asilah
 Scheherazade on Geneva Lake
 The Treasure of Talking
 1952
 1954 Papers
 1981
 A Palm on Edge
 Alexandria Papers
 A Matter of Barbarianism

Other Works 

 Side Talks (Short story collection)
 Salah Issa participated in a book (The Conspiracy, Balfour Promise) 2_11_1917

Death 
Gamil died on April 10, 2020, at the age of 83, in a nursing home in the Swiss city of Basel. He spent the last two years in home after suffering from Alzheimer’s disease.

References 

Egyptian novelists
Egyptian male writers
1937 births
2020 deaths
People from Giza Governorate